Bushido or Bushidō represented regulations for samurai attitudes and behavior of feudal Japan.

Bushido may also refer to:

Games
 Bushido (game), a German board game where players compete for honor to become the next Emperor of Japan
 Bushido (role-playing game), a role playing game from the late 20th century
 Garena Free Fire – a mobile game has a character named Hayato whose skill is generally named as Bushido, which he uses to penetrate the enemy's Armor by shooting after getting some damage on himself

Fictional characters
 Bushido (comics), a DC comics character
 Bushido (G.I. Joe), a fictional character in the G.I. Joe universe
 Mr. Bushido, a character in the anime series Mobile Suit Gundam 00
 Kenji Bushido, a foe in the racing game Need for Speed: Carbon
 Roronoa Zoro, a pirate swordsman from the anime/manga series One Piece. Vivi or Miss Wednesday from the Alabasta arc calls Roronoa Zoro "Mr. Bushido" throughout the entirety of the 73-episode arc.

Other uses
 Bushido (rapper) (born 1978), a German rapper
 Bushido, Samurai Saga, a 1963 Japanese film
 Bushido: The Soul of Japan, an 1899 book
 "Bushido", a single on the album (r)Evolution by HammerFall
 Bushido, the trade name of Pride Fighting Championships lightweight and welterweight mixed martial arts events